Ludwig Bauer may refer to:

 Ludwig Bauer (1876—1935), Austro-Swiss journalist
 Ludwig Bauer (officer) (1923–2020), German World War II tank commander
 Ludwig Bauer (soldier) (1912–1944), German World War II soldier